Leo Baptist Skinner (1 August 1901 – 27 January 1970) was an Irish Fianna Fáil politician. A solicitor, he practiced in Mitchelstown with, and later took over the practice from, his father James. G. Skinner. He was elected to Dáil Éireann as a Teachta Dála (TD) for the Cork North constituency at the 1943 general election, and was re-elected at the 1944 general election. He lost his seat at the 1948 general election. He was appointed a District Court judge in 1966.

His daughter Geraldine Skinner became the Legal Adviser in the Department of Foreign Affairs in Dublin and subsequently the Irish Ambassador in Luxembourg. His nephew was James John Skinner the Zambian politician and jurist.

References

1901 births
1970 deaths
Fianna Fáil TDs
Members of the 11th Dáil
Members of the 12th Dáil
Politicians from County Cork
Irish solicitors